Eugène Benoist (28 November 1831, Nangis – 23 May 1887, Paris) was a French classical philologist.

From 1852 he studied at the École Normale Supérieure in Paris, followed by work as a schoolteacher at the lycée in Marseille. In 1862 he obtained his doctorate, and five years later became a lecturer of ancient literature in Nancy. In 1869 he attained the title of professor, and from 1871, taught classes in foreign literature at the University of Aix-en-Provence. In 1874 he returned to Paris as a professeur suppléant of Latin poetry at the Sorbonne, where in 1876 he gained a full professorship. In 1884 he was elected a member of the Académie des Inscriptions et Belles-Lettres.

He was the author of many works, for the most part, editions of ancient Latin authors, or critical articles on sections of Latin works; its original authors being: Plautus, Terence, Lucretius, Virgil, Horace, Catullus, Julius Caesar and Livy.

Selected works 
 De personis muliebribus apud Plautum, 1862 (dissertation thesis).
 Titi Macci Plauti Cistellariam, 1863 (edition of Plautus).
 P. Virgilii Maronis Opera. Les oeuvres de Virgile (3 volumes), 1867-72 – Works of Virgil.
 Commentaire sur Lucrèce (livre V, 1-111; 678-1455), 1872 – Commentary on Lucretius.
 Plaute : Morceaux choisis ; publiés avec une préface, 1880 – Plautus; excerpts.
 C. Valeri Catulli liber. Les poésies de Catulle, (with Eugène Rostand), 1878 – Poetry of Catullus.
 Les Adelphes, 1881 (edition of Terence's Adelphoe).
 Commentaires sur la guerre des Gaules : texte latin, 1893 – Commentary on the Gallic Wars (Julius Caesar). 
 Nouveau dictionnaire latin-français (with Henri Goelzer), 1893, 10th edition 1925 – New Latin-French dictionary.

References

External links
 

1831 births
1887 deaths
People from Seine-et-Marne
École Normale Supérieure alumni
Academic staff of Nancy-Université
Academic staff of the University of Paris
Academic staff of Aix-Marseille University
French philologists
French Latinists